

de

dea-deb
deanol aceglumate (INN)
Deapril-ST
deboxamet (INN)
debrisoquine (INN)
debropol (INN)

dec-def
Deca-Durabolin
Decabid
Decaderm
decamethonium bromide (INN)
Decapryn
Decaspray (Merck & Co.)
decimemide (INN)
decitabine (INN)
decitropine (INN)
declenperone (INN)
Declomycin
declopramide (INN)
decloxizine (INN)
decominol (INN)
decoquinate (INN)
dectaflur (INN)
deditonium bromide (INN)
deferasirox (USAN)
deferiprone (INN)
deferitrin (USAN)
deferoxamine (INN)
defibrotide (INN)
Definity
deflazacort (INN)
deforolimus (INN)
defosfamide (INN)

deg-deh
degarelix (INN)
dehydrocholic acid (INN)
dehydroemetine (INN)

del
Del-Vi-A

dela-dels
delafloxacin (USAN, INN)
Delalutin
delamanid (USAN)
delanterone (INN)
delapril (INN)
Delatestryl
delavirdine (INN)
Delaxin
Delcobese
delequamine (INN)
delergotrile (INN)
Delestrogen
delfantrine (INN)
delfaprazine (INN)
Delfen
Delflex
deligoparin sodium (USAN)
delimotecan (INN)
delmadinone (INN)
delmetacin (INN)
delmitide (USAN)
delmopinol (INN)
delorazepam (INN)
deloxolone (INN)
delprostenate (INN)
Delsym
delucemine (USAN)

delt
Delta-Cortef
Delta-Dome
Deltalin
Deltasone
deltibant (INN)

dem
Demadex
Demazin
dembrexine (INN)
demecarium bromide (INN)
Demeclocycline
demeclocycline (INN)
demecolcine (INN)
demecycline (INN)
demegestone (INN)
demelverine (INN)
Demerol (Sanofi Aventis)
demexiptiline (INN)
Demi-Regroton
demiditraz (INN)
democonazole (INN)
demoxepam (INN)
demoxytocin (INN)
Demser
Demulen

den
denagliptin (USAN, INN)
Denatonium (INN)
denaverine (INN)
Denavir
denbufylline (INN)
Dendrid
denenicokin (USAN, INN)
denibulin (USAN, INN)
denileukin diftitox (INN)
denipride (INN)
denopamine (INN)
denosumab (INN)
denotivir (INN)
denpidazone (INN)
denufosol tetrasodium (USAN)
denzimol (INN)

dep-deq
Depacon
Depakene
Depakote
depelestat (USAN)
Depen
Depinar
Depo-Estradiol
Depo-Medrol
Depo-Provera
Depo-Testadiol
Depo-Testosterone
Depocyt
DepoCyt (Skye Pharmaceuticals)
Depodur
depramine (INN)
depreotide (INN)
deprodone (INN)
deprostil (INN)
deptropine (INN)
dequalinium chloride (INN)

der
deramciclane (INN)
derenofylline (INN)
deriglidole (INN)
Derma-Smoothe
Dermabet
Dermacort
Dermatop
derpanicate (INN)
derquantel (USAN, INN)

des

desa-desm
desaspidin (INN)
desciclovir (INN)
descinolone (INN)
deserpidine (INN)
Desferal
desflurane (INN)
desglugastrin (INN)
desipramine (INN)
desirudin (INN)
deslanoside (INN)
desloratadine
deslorelin (INN)
desmethylmoramide (INN)
Desmopressin Acetate
desmopressin (INN)
desmoteplase (USAN)

deso-desy
desocriptine (INN)
Desogen
desogestrel (INN)
desomorphine (INN)
desonide (INN)
Desowen
desoximetasone (INN)
desoxycortone (INN)
Desoxyn (Lundbeck)
desvenlafaxine (USAN)
Desyrel

det-dev
detajmium bitartrate (INN)
detanosal (INN)
deterenol (INN)
detirelix (INN)
detomidine (INN)
detorubicin (INN)
detralfate (INN)
Detrol
detrothyronine (INN)
detumomab (INN)
devapamil (INN)
devazepide (INN)

dex

dexa-dexe
Dexacen-4
Dexacidin
Dexacort
Dexair
dexamethasone acefurate (INN)
dexamethasone cipecilate (INN)
dexamethasone (INN)
dexamfetamine (INN)
dexamisole (INN)
Dexampex
Dexamyl
Dexasporin
dexbrompheniramine (INN)
dexchlorpheniramine maleate
dexchlorpheniramine (INN)
dexclamol (INN)
dexecadotril (INN)
Dexedrine
dexefaroxan (INN)
dexelvucitabine (USAN, INN)
dexetimide (INN)
dexetozoline (INN)

dexf-dexs
dexfenfluramine (INN)
Dexferrum
dexfosfoserine (INN)
dexibuprofen (INN)
Dexidin
deximafen (INN)
dexindoprofen (INN)
dexivacaine (INN)
dexketoprofen (INN)
dexlansoprazole (INN)
dexlofexidine (INN)
dexloxiglumide (INN)
dexmedetomidine (INN)
dexmethylphenidate (USAN)
dexnafenodone (INN)
dexnebivolol (INN)
dexniguldipine (INN)
Dexone
dexormaplatin (INN)
dexoxadrol (INN)
dexpanthenol (INN)
dexpemedolac (INN)
dexpramipexole (USAN)
dexpropranolol (INN)
dexproxibutene (INN)
dexrazoxane (INN)
dexsecoverine (INN)
dexsotalol (INN)

dext-dexv
dextilidine (INN)
dextofisopam (USAN)
dextran (INN)
dextranomer (INN)
dextriferron (INN)
dextrofemine (INN)
dextromethorphan (INN)
dextromoramide (INN)
dextropropoxyphene (INN)
dextrorphan (INN)
Dextrostat
dextrothyroxine sodium (INN)
dexverapamil (INN)

dez
dezaguanine (INN)
dezinamide (INN)
dezocine (INN)